Scotorythra oxyphractis is a moth of the family Geometridae. It was first described by Edward Meyrick in 1899. It is endemic to the Hawaiian islands of Kauai, Oahu, Molokai and Hawaii.

External links

O
Endemic moths of Hawaii
Biota of Hawaii (island)
Biota of Kauai
Biota of Oahu